Hush is a 1998 American thriller film starring Jessica Lange and Gwyneth Paltrow.

Plot

Newlyweds Helen and Jackson live together in New York City. At the beginning of the film, the two are driving towards the Kentucky farmhouse, Kilronan, where Jackson grew up, primarily to introduce Helen to Jackson's mother, Martha, during the Christmas holidays. They arrive late in the evening and go straight to bed. The next morning Helen awakens to Martha arranging the room, as she thought Helen was asleep in the other bedroom. During their stay Martha tries to convince Jackson to stay to help her run the farm. Helen notices that Martha cleans their room and arranges their things every day, including Helen's contraceptive.

After returning to New York in the new year, Helen discovers she is pregnant after getting violently ill at work. When she informs Jackson of this, he asks her to marry him and she accepts. The wedding is held at Kilronan, where Helen meets Jackson's paternal grandmother, Alice, who tells Helen she doesn't trust Martha. Alice points out Martha is extremely smart and capable of doing the farmwork of four men. Before Alice can say more Martha interrupts.

After the wedding they return to their New York apartment. One night after work, Helen is assaulted by a burglar who steals her locket and makes sexual advances. When Helen tells him she's pregnant, he cuts her abdomen and leaves. The fetus is not injured.

Martha arrives unannounced, saying she wants to sell Kilronan because she cannot run it alone. Helen tells Jackson she wants to move to Kentucky and in with Martha for a year and help renovate the land. Jackson tells Helen that his father, Jack, died in the house when he was seven; Jackson blames himself because he ran into his father, pushing him down the stairs to his death. Jackson also tells Helen that his father had been cheating on Martha with a woman named Robin Hayes. Helen says they should go back to the farm so Jackson can face his "old ghosts".

The couple move in with Martha, who attempts to divide them with subversive comments and manipulating the family friends and neighbors. When Helen goes to the doctor, she finds out Martha told him Helen wanted to have the baby at the house, even though Helen had never said that. Suspicious and increasingly annoyed, Helen talks to Alice, who tells her that Jackson is not responsible for his father's death. When Jack fell, his sternum was supposedly crushed by the nail puller that he fell onto at the bottom of the stairs; according to news reports, this was a freak accident. When Helen returns that evening she finds Jackson calling around asking for her whereabouts with Martha hovering close by. Helen's frigid attitude toward her mother-in-law prompts Martha to visit Alice and warn her to stay away from them.

Having had enough of Martha's manipulations, Helen tells Jackson that Martha is tearing their marriage apart. He agrees to go back to New York and tells his mother, who appears to accept it gracefully. Martha is completely convinced the baby will be a boy, and that Helen is a bad influence on her son and unborn grandchild.

Jackson leaves the farm on a work call, leaving Helen and Martha alone. That evening, Martha bakes a strawberry cheesecake for Helen laced with pitocin, a labor inducer. Helen wakes up the next morning, feeling strange. She discovers a baby room set up by Martha and finds her stolen locket amongst the baby clothes. When Martha unexpectedly enters the room, Helen tries unsuccessfully to escape, driving to a neighboring farm and coming face to face with her attacker from New York, a neighbor of Martha's, then attempting to escape on foot before Martha captures her at the side of the highway.

Reluctantly, Helen gives birth at the house, with Martha looking on, offering assistance, but refusing to give Helen painkillers. Martha leaves the room to answer a phone call from Jackson. She tells him that everything is okay, but when Helen screams in pain, Martha hangs up.

Helen eventually gives birth to a healthy boy. She begs Martha to hand her the baby, but Martha ignores her, telling the baby she is his mother. Martha tries to inject a needle full of morphine in Helen's arm, but Helen knocks the syringe away. By the time Martha retrieves it, she hears Jackson's footsteps in the house. In a scramble, she quickly cleans up, meeting Jackson at the door with the newborn baby. She tells him to leave Helen alone, as he has no idea what she's been through. The two leave Helen asleep, and Martha gives the baby to Jackson.

That night, Martha enters Helen's bedroom with the syringe, but she finds Jackson awake in a chair next to the bed. Despite his mother's insistence that he return to bed, he stays, thereby thwarting her plan. The next morning, Helen awakens to see Jackson with the baby. As Helen finally holds her child she tells Jackson to ask Martha to make breakfast for them.

At breakfast, Helen enters the house with an object in her bag, which turns out to be the nail puller that killed Jack.  She then proceeds to tell Jackson the whole truth about his father's death, revealing that Martha, not Jack, was the one having an affair with Robin Hayes, who was a male horse wrangler and not a woman as Jackson had been told by Martha. When Jack discovered the affair, he decided to leave Martha, who staged the 'accident' to get rid of him and tricked Jackson into believing that he was responsible for it in order to keep him under her thumb for the rest of his life.  Helen also shows Jackson a vicious bruise from Martha's attempt to murder her so she could have him and their son to herself. Martha denies everything and says that Helen cannot prove anything. However, Jackson by now has remembered that Martha was pulling nails off the shed on the day his father died, and thus has realized the truth of Helen's words. This causes Jackson to angrily disown Martha from their lives, sever all ties with her, and announce the sale of Kilronan and its contents. Enraged and unwilling to admit her own faults, Martha desperately attempts to persuade Jackson that Helen is coming between them out of jealousy, claiming that Helen wants to be her. Helen dismissively shuts Martha up by slapping her to the ground, and she and Jackson then leave the house with their baby in their arms, while a defeated Martha breaks down sobbing on the floor, her hopes permanently destroyed and forever dashed.

In the final scene, the couple visit Alice before they leave for good, presenting her with her great-grandson.

Cast

Soundtrack
Intrada released a limited edition album of Christopher Young's score on November 12, 2012.

 Hush (18:32) 
 Little Baby (4:41) 
 Don't (7:56) 
 You (3:43) 
 Cry (5:39) 
 Mama's Gonna (10:36) 
 Buy You (4:44) 
 A (4:37) 
 Hush (Concert Suite) (15:01)

Reception
Hush has earned a 14% freshness rating on Rotten Tomatoes movie review website based on 42 reviews. The site's consensus states: "A ridiculous but wholly predictable potboiler with performances ranging from comatose to hysterical."

Roger Ebert has been quoted as saying that Hush is "the kind of movie where you walk in, watch the first 10 minutes, know exactly where it's going, and hope devoutly that you're wrong. It's one of those Devouring Woman movies where the villainess never plays a scene without a drink and a cigarette, and the hero is inattentive to the victim to the point of dementia."

Jessica Lange earned a Golden Raspberry Award nomination for Worst Actress, losing to the Spice Girls for Spice World.

References

External links
 
 
 
 

1998 films
1990s psychological thriller films
American pregnancy films
TriStar Pictures films
Films scored by Christopher Young
Films produced by Douglas Wick
Films shot in Virginia
Films set in Kentucky
Films set in Manhattan
American thriller films
American thriller drama films
1990s pregnancy films
1998 directorial debut films
Films about mother–son relationships
1990s English-language films
1990s American films